Rowy may refer to the following places in Poland:
Rowy, Łódź Voivodeship (central Poland)
Rowy, Pomeranian Voivodeship (north Poland)
Rowy, Podlaskie Voivodeship (north-east Poland)
Rowy, Garwolin County in Masovian Voivodeship (east-central Poland)
Rowy, Pułtusk County in Masovian Voivodeship (east-central Poland)
Rowy, Warmian-Masurian Voivodeship (north Poland)

See also
Siemień-Rowy